Wormeldange (  or (locally)) is a commune and small town in eastern Luxembourg. It is part of the canton of Grevenmacher.

, the town of Wormeldange, which lies in the south of the commune, has a population of 742.  Other towns within the commune include Ahn, Ehnen, Machtum, and Wormeldange-Haut.

Population

References

External links
 

 
Communes in Grevenmacher (canton)
Towns in Luxembourg